Norman George Rodgers (born September 21, 1927) was an American politician in the state of Iowa.

Rodgers was born in Chatfield, Minnesota. Graduating from high school in 1944, he is a farmer and former grocer. He served in the Iowa State Senate from 1973 to 1987, and House of Representatives from 1969 to 1973, as a Democrat.

References

1927 births
Possibly living people
People from Chatfield, Minnesota
Businesspeople from Iowa
Farmers from Iowa
Democratic Party Iowa state senators
Democratic Party members of the Iowa House of Representatives